Girls' Crystal was a British weekly story paper and then a comic book published by Amalgamated Press (AP) that ran from 1935 to 1963. Along with School Friend and Girl, it was one of the first British girls' comics.

Publication history 
The publication launched on 28 October 1935 as The Crystal, a play off the popular AP boys' story paper The Gem. With issue #10, the publication changed title to The Girls' Crystal.

In 1940, the fellow AP story paper The Schoolgirl merged into Girls' Crystal (ironically, The Schoolgirl was a continuation of the story paper School Friend; many years later, the Girls' Crystal comic merged into the School Friend comic).

Stories from Girls' Crystal were reprinted in Schoolgirls' Own Library and the Girls' Crystal Annual.

With the 21 March 1953 issue (issue #909), Girls' Crystal converted from story paper to comic book, continuing the numbering. Amalgamated Press was acquired in 1959, and the publication of Girls' Crystal was taken over by Fleetway Publications, continuing until April 1963 when the comic was merged into School Friend.

Story paper 
Girls' Crystal featured 4-5 rotating storylines, one of the most notable being Daphne Grayson's Merrymakers series. Another popular feature was about a detective named Noel Raymond and his niece/assistant June Gaynor. Written by Ronald Fleming as "Peter Langley," the serial was unusual in a girls' magazine that both the main character and the writer pseudonym were male.. These stories lasted until May 1951.

Controversy 
Author Horace E. Boyten wrote some stories under the pseudonym "Enid Boyten." In 1953, lawyers for the popular children's writer Enid Blyton complained to Girls' Crystal editor Reg Eves that the names were similar enough that the publication was trying to cash in on Blyton's fame. Eves denied the charge, but from then on, Boyten wrote under the name "Hilda Boyten" (later changing it again to "Helen Crawford").

Some years later, text serialization of the Enid Blyton books The Famous Five, The Secret Seven, and The Mystery of Banshee Towers appeared in the Amalgamated Press comics Princess, School Friend, and June.

Comic book 
The content of the Girls' Crystal comic was a mix of school stories, girl-next-door stories, romance, mystery, and travel adventure. Skating and ballet were common subjects, as were animals and the circus.

A regular text feature was Trixie's Diary. The Sally and Dave the Gay Adventurers text feature appeared in issues at the end of the run. Another text feature was Carol of the Circus. Many of the text features were written by Elise Probyn. 

Illustrators for the comic strips included John M. Burns, Luis Bermejo, Tom Kerr, and John Armstrong.

Strips 

 Bruce the Circus Dog
 Ella and the Mississippi Showboat
 The Fourth Form Treasure Seekers
 Friends of the Skating Star
 Hal's Exciting Find
 June and the Jungle Boy
 Lucy's Perilous Mission
 The Make-Believe Princess
 Molly in Morocco
 Mystery at Beacon College
 Naida of the Jungle
 Not-So-Simple Susie
 Peggy at the Rajah's Palace
 The Rebels of Island Castle
 The Secret of Bear Glacier
 Secret Enemy of the Fourth Form Magazine
 Shirley's Detective Schooldays
 The Skating Coach's Amazing Secret
 Star the Sheepdog
 Terry's Forbidden Circus Friend
 That Thrilling Christmas at Crossways
 The TV Quiz Girls
 Val — the Girl Who Helped Mr. Nemo
 Wanda of Bear Park

References

Sources

External links 
 Girls' Crystal scans at Comic Book +

1935 establishments in the United Kingdom
1963 disestablishments in the United Kingdom
British comics titles
British girls' comics
Defunct British comics
Defunct magazines published in the United Kingdom
Magazines established in 1935
Magazines disestablished in 1963
Weekly magazines published in the United Kingdom